Vexillum baeri is a species of small sea snail, marine gastropod mollusk in the family Costellariidae, the ribbed miters.

Description
The length of the shell attains 35.4 mm; its diameter 12 mm.

Distribution
This marine species occurs off the Philippines.

References

 Poppe, G. T.; Tagaro, S.; Salisbury, R. A. (2009). New species of Mitridae and Costellariidae from the Philippines. Visaya Supplement. 4: 1-86.

External links
 Image of Vexillum baeri

baeri
Gastropods described in 2009